Salehabad-e Bozorg (also Romanized as Şāleḩābād-e Bozorg) is a village in Robat Rural District, in the Central District of Sabzevar County, Razavi Khorasan Province, Iran. At the 2006 census, its population was 343, in 95 families.

References 

Populated places in Sabzevar County